"I Know" is a song by American rapper YoungBoy Never Broke Again from his fourth studio album The Last Slimeto (2022). Produced by Cheese and Eliot Bohr, it peaked at number 46 on the Billboard Hot 100. The song serves as the introduction to the thirty-track album and sees YoungBoy rap on a mellow guitar beat about love and heartbreak throuout his life.

Composition
The song is the only track on the album which features only one verse. The mellow song has a "plaintive guitar and eerie absence of drums."

Critical reception
In a review of The Last Slimeto, Charles Lyons-Burt from Slant Magazine notes that the song "drips with melancholy, as YoungBoy begs a lover not to leave, knowing fully that she’s already gone." Robin Murray from Clash stated that the intro "has plenty of soul." HipHopDXs Scott Glasher noted that the track "sees YoungBoy waxing spirituals over gushing guitar strings" and that "his hallowing croons ring from the listener’s headphones, presenting him more like a mega-church preacher than a rapper."

Music Video
The song's official music video was released alongside the album's release. It sees YoungBoy dancing in front of a green screen while surrounded by fire which represents the burning of his heart.

Personnel
Credits and personnel adapted from Tidal.

Musicians
 Jason Michael Goldberg – composer, songwriter
 Eliot Bohr – production, composer, songwriter
 Kentrell DeSean Gaulden – lead artist, songwriter, composer

Technical
 Cheese – mastering engineer
 Cheese – mixing engineer
 Cheese – recording engineer

Charts

References

2022 songs
YoungBoy Never Broke Again songs
Songs written by YoungBoy Never Broke Again